Frisilia nesiotes is a moth in the family Lecithoceridae. It was described by Kyu-Tek Park and Chun-Sheng Wu in 2008. It is found in Sri Lanka.

The wingspan is 14–15 mm. The forewings are greyish orange, with dark-brown scales irregularly scattered on the upper surface. The discal spot is small at the middle and the reniform stigma is found below the cell, connected to the inner margin by a brownish fascia. There are dark-brown scales along the costa at the basal one-fourth. There are also dark-brown scales along margin of the termen. The hindwings are pale grey.

Etymology
The species name is derived from the Greek nesiote (meaning islander).

References

Moths described in 2008
Frisilia